Marlys or Marlis is a women's given name. It is the name of:
Marlys Edwardh (born 1950), Canadian lawyer
Marlis Hochbruck (born 1964), German mathematician
Marlys Koschinsky (born 1959), Canadian cardiovascular researcher
Marlys Millhiser (1938–2017), American mystery author
Marlis Spescha (born 1967), Swiss skier
Marlis Petersen (born 1968), German opera singer
Marlys West, American poet and writer

See also
Marlys, recurring character in the comics of Lynda Barry